Tuberes is a genus of sea snails, marine gastropod mollusks in the family Tornidae.

Species
 Tuberes marianae Rubio & Rolán, 2017
 Tuberes minituber  Rubio & Rolán, 2017
 Tuberes papuensis  Rubio & Rolán, 2017
 Tuberes philippinensis  Rubio & Rolán, 2017
 Tuberes postremus  Rubio & Rolán, 2017
 Tuberes solomonensis  Rubio & Rolán, 2017
 Tuberes tornatus (A. Adams, 1864)
 Tuberes vanuatuensis  Rubio & Rolán, 2017

References

Rubio F. & Rolán E. (2017). Tuberes, a new genus of the family Tornidae (Gastropoda, Truncatelloidea) from the Pacific Ocean, with the description of 7 new species. Iberus. 35(2): 185-201.

Tornidae